The Rómulo Betancourt Doctrine is a doctrine of foreign policy promoted by the president of Venezuela Rómulo Betancourt that establishes the rupture of diplomatic relations with governments without democratic and dictatorial origins.

History
When he was sworn in before the Congress of the Republic in the Federal Legislative Palace, In his inaugural address, Betancourt made clear his political perspective and proclaimed what is now known as the Betancourt Doctrine and made his pronouncement about the new police doctrine for the country: “Shoot first, ascertain later.” One of the clearest marks of Betancourt’s repressive policy was marked on August 4, 1959, with the following words:  This proclamation is understood as an instrument of protection for democratic regimes, the result of the free election of the people. It rejects the recognition of non-democratic or illegitimate governments, which has its meaning in the rupture of diplomatic relations with those dictatorial countries and proclaims the alliance with those who practice a democratic politics in their villages.

Under the Betancourt Doctrine, Venezuela maintained good relations with the democratic governments, especially with the government of John F. Kennedy in United States, Luis Muñoz Marín in Puerto Rico, Manuel Ávila Camacho and Adolfo López Mateos in Mexico and Alberto Lleras Camargo in Colombia. In turn, it cut diplomatic relations with the governments of Spain, Cuba, Dominican Republic, Argentina, Peru, Ecuador, Guatemala, Honduras and Haiti.

See also
 Estrada Doctrine

References

Diplomacy
1960s in Venezuela
Rómulo Betancourt